Flindersia laevicarpa, commonly known in Australia as rose ash, scented maple or dirran maple, is a species of medium-sized to large tree in the family Rutaceae and is native to Papua New Guinea, West Papua and Queensland. It has pinnate leaves with four to eight egg-shaped to elliptical leaflets, panicles of cream-coloured, yellowish, red or purple flowers and smooth woody fruit that split into five at maturity, releasing winged seeds.

Description

Taxonomy
Flindersia laevicarpa was first formally described in 1920 by Cyril Tenison White and William D. Francis in the Botany Bulletin of the Queensland Department of Agriculture.

In 1969, Thomas Hartley described two varieties and the name of the autonym is accepted by the Australian Plant Census:

Distribution and habitat

References

laevicarpa
Sapindales of Australia
Flora of Papua New Guinea
Flora of Queensland
Taxa named by Cyril Tenison White
Plants described in 1920